Bring the Light  may refer to:

"Bring the Light", a song by The Smashing Pumpkins from their 2007 album Zeitgeist
"Bring the Light" (Beady Eye song), the 2010 debut single by Beady Eye
 "To Bring the Light", Science Fiction story by David Drake, published in "Lest Darkness Fall and Related Stories"